Juan Carlos Guillamón Ruiz (born 24 November 1974 in Murcia) is a Spanish former cyclist.

Major results
1996
1st Stage 6 Circuito Montañés
1999
1st Troféu Joaquim Agostinho
2002
1st  Road race, National Road Championships

References

External links

1974 births
Living people
Spanish male cyclists
Sportspeople from Murcia
Cyclists from the Region of Murcia